Rela Hospital is a multi-specialty hospital based in Chromepet, Chennai, India. It was founded in 2018 by Prof. Mohamed Rela, Liver transplantation surgeon who currently serves as its chairman and Director. It is a 450-bedded facility with over 55 clinical departments, and is primarily known for critically ill and multi-organ transplantation.

History 
The hospital was started in 2018 in Chromepet, Chennai, as a multi-specialty hospital with focus on critically ill and multi-organ transplantation. The 450 beds hospital is spread over 36 acres of land in Chennai and has 130 critical care beds, 14 operating rooms and advanced Radiology & Laboratory services.

In 2019, Rela Hospital performed a successful pediatric liver transplant on a 42 days old boy, which was the youngest successful pediatric liver transplant in India.

Facilities 
Rela Hospital has 55 medical departments and specialties to name a few Advanced Paediatric, Liver Disease and Transplantation, Obstetrics and Gynaecology, Orthopaedics, Critical Care and Anaesthesiology, Gastroenterology, Cardiology, Ear Nose and Throat diseases, Neurology, Radiotherapy, Radiology Treatment, Urological Diseases, Plastic & Reconstructive Surgery and other treatments.

References 

Hospitals in Chennai
2018 establishments in Tamil Nadu
Hospitals established in 2018